UQ is the University of Queensland, a public research university in Queensland, Australia.

UQ may also refer to:

 Urumqi Airlines (IATA code UQ)
 Ubiquinone, or coenzyme Q
 Uncertainty quantification
 Universal Queue, a concept in contact center design
 Université du Québec, the public university system in Quebec, Canada
 Universities Quarterly, now renamed Higher Education Quarterly, a journal published by the Society for Research into Higher Education

See also

 
 
 QU (disambiguation)